Communist Party of Western Ukraine was a political party in eastern interwar Poland. Until 1923 it was known as the Communist Party of Eastern Galicia (Komunistyczna Partia Wschodniej Galicji).

Young Communist League of Western Ukraine was the youth league of the party.

According to Timothy D. Snyder, the Communist Party of Western Ukraine was an illegal and conspiratorial organization in interwar Galicia and Volhynia. It had a small formal membership, but had a large influence via front organizations. Its membership was mostly Ukrainian in the countryside and Jewish in towns. 

The party was more influential during the NEP era in the Bolshevist Russia and the Soviet Union, and the Ukrainization in the Soviet Ukraine. Its influence faded away in 1930s due to Stalin's regime in the USSR and execution of his policies in Ukraine by Pavel Postyshev and Lazar Kaganovich. At times, the Communist Party of Western Ukraine was split into different wings, the pro-Soviet faction and more independent one. In 1927, the majority of the Central Committee of the CPWU supported the 'nationalist' faction of Alexander Shumsky in the CPU(B). Consequently, Kaganovich, who was the general secretary of the CPU(B), accused the Western Ukrainian communists of treason. The CPWU split into majority 'nationalist' faction and a pro-Kaganovich minority. On 18 February 1928 the majority-CPWU led by Ivan Krilyk and Roman Turyansky was expelled from the Comintern. By the end of 1928, the CPWU (majority) disbanded itself and its leaders who expressed regrets because of their 'errors' went to the USSR, where they were later repressed. The pro-Soviet minority continued as CPWU.

In 1938, the Executive Committee of the Comintern decided to disband the Communist Party of Poland, together with the Communist parties of Western Belarus and Western Ukraine. This decision was sparked by accusations that the leadership of those parties had been taken over by 'fascist agents'. Almost all the members of the CPWU who were in the USSR at the time, were repressed. Many activists who remained in Western Ukraine (Poland) were repressed later in 1939, after the Soviet invasion of Poland.

See also
 Communist Party of Poland

References

 
1919 establishments in Poland
1919 establishments in Ukraine
1938 disestablishments in Poland
1938 disestablishments in the Soviet Union
Western Ukraine
Defunct communist parties in Poland
Defunct communist parties in Ukraine
Political parties disestablished in 1938
Political parties established in 1919
Political repression in the Soviet Union
Ukrainian political parties in Poland
Separatism in Poland